Ian Loveland (born September 7, 1983) is an American professional mixed martial arts fighter. Loveland has fought for promotions such as King of the Cage, International Fight League, and the Ultimate Fighting Championship.

Mixed Martial Arts Career
Loveland's interest in martial arts started when he was five years old. He began training in Tae Kwon Do because, "I kept getting into fights and my parents wanted an outlet for me". Upon entering high school, Loveland realized Tae Kwon Do, "wasn't for me", and he picked up wrestling.

Before turning pro, Loveland held an amateur record of 7-0, with six submission wins and one lone knockout win. In 2005, Loveland made his professional debut defeating current UFC fighter, Bryan Caraway. He won his next two fights via first round submissions.

After earning a record of 4-4, Loveland signed onto fight for the Ring of Combat's featherweight tournament. His first fight was against former WEC fighter, Will Kerr. He defeated Kerr via first round submission, moving onto the semi-finals. Before continuing on in the tournament, Loveland defeated CJ Thompson in SportFight, and lost to Wagnney Fabiano in the International Fight League (IFL).

Loveland defeated Rich Boine in the semi-finals for the Ring of Combat tournament. A month later in the finals, Loveland was defeated by James Jones.

He lost his second fight for the IFL, being defeated by Jason Palacios. He bounced back from the two fight losing skid, winning all six of his next fights - one of which was featured for the IFL.

Ultimate Fighting Championship
With less than two weeks notice, Loveland stepped in for Leonard Garcia and fought Tyler Toner at The Ultimate Fighter 12 Finale. Loveland dominated all three rounds and won the fight via unanimous decision (30-27, 29-28, 30-26). After the fight, Loveland said he would likely drop to the bantamweight division.

Loveland faced Joseph Benavidez on March 19, 2011 at UFC 128. He lost the fight via unanimous decision.

Loveland fought Yves Jabouin on August 27, 2011 at UFC 134, losing via split decision. In the loss, Loveland suffered a possible chest injury and is out for up to 6 months. Despite the injury, he was released from the promotion.

Mixed martial arts record

| Win
|align=center| 18–10
| Enoch Wilson
| Submission (armbar)
| KOTC: No Fear
| 
|align=center| 1
|align=center| N/A
|Lincoln City, Oregon, United States
|
|-
| Win
|align=center| 17–10
| Gabriel Solorio
| TKO (punches)
| WFC 25: Brawl at the Beach
| 
|align=center| 1
|align=center| N/A
|Lincoln City, Oregon, United States
|
|-
| Loss
|align=center| 16–10
| Kyoji Horiguchi
| Decision (unanimous)
| Vale Tudo Japan 2012
| 
|align=center| 3
|align=center| 5:00
| Tokyo, Japan
| 
|-
| Win
|align=center| 16–9
| Casey Olson
| KO (head kick and punches)
| Tachi Palace Fights 14
| 
|align=center| 1
|align=center| 0:38
| Lemoore, California, United States
| 
|-
| Win
|align=center| 15–9
| Alexander Crispim
| KO (knee)
| Tachi Palace Fights 13
| 
|align=center| 1
|align=center| 4:23
| Lemoore, California, United States
| 
|-
| Loss
|align=center| 14–9
| Yves Jabouin
| Decision (split)
| UFC 134
| 
|align=center| 3
|align=center| 5:00
| Rio de Janeiro, Brazil
| 
|-
| Loss
|align=center| 14–8
| Joseph Benavidez
| Decision (unanimous)
| UFC 128
| 
|align=center| 3
|align=center| 5:00
| Newark, New Jersey, United States
| 
|-
| Win
|align=center| 14–7
| Tyler Toner
| Decision (unanimous)
| The Ultimate Fighter 12 Finale
| 
|align=center| 3
|align=center| 5:00
| Las Vegas, Nevada, United States
| 
|-
| Win
|align=center| 13–7
| Xavier Desrochers
| TKO (punches)
| Wreck MMA
| 
|align=center| 1
|align=center| 0:41
| Gatineau, Quebec, Canada
| 
|-
| Win
|align=center| 12–7
| Douglas Evans
| KO (head kick)
| Arctic Combat 1
| 
|align=center| 5
|align=center| 0:09
| Fairbanks, Alaska, United States
| 
|-
| Win
|align=center| 11–7
| Chris Barrera
| TKO (punches)
| Raw Power MMA
| 
|align=center| 1
|align=center| N/A
| Bahrain
| 
|-
| Win
|align=center| 10–7
| Chanti Johnson
| KO (punches)
| Rumble on the Ridge 6
| 
|align=center| 1
|align=center| 0:32
| Snoqualmie, Washington, United States
| 
|-
| Win
|align=center| 9–7
| Dennis Davis
| Submission (guillotine choke)
| IFL: Las Vegas
| 
|align=center| 2
|align=center| 0:58
| Las Vegas, Nevada, United States
| 
|-
| Win
|align=center| 8–7
| Andy Lukesh
| Decision (unanimous)
| SportFight 20: Homecoming
| 
|align=center| 3
|align=center| 5:00
| Portland, Oregon, United States
| 
|-
| Loss
|align=center| 7–7
| Jason Palacios
| Submission (rear-naked choke)
| IFL: Everett
| 
|align=center| 1
|align=center| 1:48
| Everett, Washington, United States
| 
|-
| Loss
|align=center| 7–6
| James Jones
| Submission (armbar)
| Ring of Combat 14
| 
|align=center| 1
|align=center| 3:17
| Atlantic City, New Jersey, United States
| 
|-
| Win
|align=center| 7–5
| Rich Boine
| Submission (guillotine choke)
| Ring of Combat 13
| 
|align=center| 1
|align=center| 1:22
| Atlantic City, New Jersey, United States
| 
|-
| Loss
|align=center| 6–5
| Wagnney Fabiano
| Submission (arm-triangle choke)
| IFL: Atlanta
| 
|align=center| 1
|align=center| 0:59
| Atlanta, Georgia, United States
| 
|-
| Win
|align=center| 6–4
| CJ Thompson
| Submission (rear-naked choke)
| SF 18: Turning Point
| 
|align=center| 1
|align=center| 3:23
| Portland, Oregon, United States
| 
|-
| Win
|align=center| 5–4
| Will Kerr
| Submission (guillotine choke)
| Ring of Combat 12
| 
|align=center| 1
|align=center| 2:22
| Atlantic City, New Jersey, United States
| 
|-
| Win
|align=center| 4–4
| John Yim
| TKO (punches)
| KOTC: Insurrection
| 
|align=center| N/A
|align=center| N/A
| Vernon, British Columbia, Canada
| 
|-
| Loss
|align=center| 3–4
| Trevor Burnell
| TKO (punches)
| SportFight 17: Hot Zone
| 
|align=center| 1
|align=center| 1:01
| Portland, Oregon, United States
| 
|-
| Loss
|align=center| 3–3
| Enoch Wilson
| Submission (rear-naked choke)
| SportFight 15: Tribute
| 
|align=center| 2
|align=center| 2:57
| Portland, Oregon, United States
|
|-
| Loss
|align=center| 3–2
| Ben Greer
| Submission (rear-naked choke)
| Elite Fighting 1
| 
|align=center| 4
|align=center| 1:38
| Vancouver, British Columbia, Canada
| 
|-
| Loss
|align=center| 3–1
| Akitoshi Tamura
| Submission (triangle choke)
| MARS
| 
|align=center| 1
|align=center| 3:40
| Tokyo, Japan
| 
|-
| Win
|align=center| 3–0
| Anthony Hamlett
| Submission (rear-naked choke)
| SportFight 14: Resolution
| 
|align=center| 1
|align=center| 1:04
| Portland, Oregon, United States
| 
|-
| Win
|align=center| 2–0
| Joe Doherty
| Submission (armbar)
| SportFight 13: Rocky Mountain Sportfight 	
| 
|align=center| 1
|align=center| 2:46
| Denver, Colorado, United States
| 
|-
| Win
|align=center| 1–0
| Bryan Caraway
| TKO (cut)
| SportFight 12: Breakout
| 
|align=center| 2
|align=center| 0:31
| Portland, Oregon, United States
|

References

External links

Official UFC Profile

1983 births
American male mixed martial artists
Mixed martial artists utilizing wrestling
Mixed martial artists from Oregon
Living people
Ultimate Fighting Championship male fighters
Sportspeople from Gresham, Oregon